Jassem Hamdouni (born 17 December 1996) is a Tunisian football midfielder who currently plays for CS Sfaxien.

References

1996 births
Living people
Tunisian footballers
CA Bizertin players
CS Sfaxien players
AS Rejiche players
Association football midfielders
Tunisian Ligue Professionnelle 1 players
Tunisia international footballers